Kurtis Mucha (born June 3, 1989) is a Canadian ice hockey goaltender. He is currently playing with the Alberta Golden Bears of the CIS.

Mucha played major junior hockey, with the Portland Winter Hawks and Kamloops Blazers, in the Western Hockey League (WHL) from 2005 to 2010 where he played a total of 245 games and 13,708 minutes in net to established new WHL records for most career games and most career minutes played by a goaltender.

Mucha played professional hockey in the ECHL with the Idaho Steelheads during the 2008–09 ECHL season and with the Stockton Thunder during the 2009–10 ECHL season.

On December 11, 2013, Mucha attended practice at Rexall Place with the NHL's Boston Bruins, filling in for Tuukka Rask, who was suffering from flu-like symptoms.

On March 4, 2014, Mucha dressed as the backup goalie for his local Edmonton Oilers who had just finalized a trade to send Ilya Bryzgalov to the Minnesota Wild, leaving them without a number 2 netminder. Mucha signed a one-day NHL tryout contract which afforded him the opportunity to be on the roster for the game against the Ottawa Senators.

Awards and honours

References

External links

1989 births
Living people
Alberta Golden Bears ice hockey players
Canadian ice hockey goaltenders
Fort McMurray Oil Barons players
Ice hockey people from Alberta
Idaho Steelheads (ECHL) players
Kamloops Blazers players
Portland Winterhawks players
Sportspeople from Sherwood Park
Stockton Thunder players